The Permit-class submarine (known as the Thresher class until the lead boat  was lost) was a class of nuclear-powered fast attack submarines (hull classification symbol SSN) in service with the United States Navy from the early 1960s until 1996. They were the forerunners of all subsequent US Navy SSN designs. They served from the 1960s through to the early 1990s, when they were decommissioned due to age.

The Thresher class was one of several results from a study commissioned in 1956 by Chief of Naval Operations (CNO) Admiral Arleigh Burke.  In "Project Nobska", the Committee on Undersea Warfare of the United States National Academy of Sciences, collaborating with numerous other agencies, considered the lessons of submarine warfare and anti-submarine warfare learned from various prototypes and experimental platforms. The design was managed under project SCB 188.

Design
The new class kept the proven S5W reactor plant from the immediately preceding s, but were a radical change in many other ways. The Threshers had the large bow-mounted sonar sphere and angled, amidships torpedo tubes used in the concurrently-built . This placed the sonar sphere in the optimum position for detection of targets at long range. Tullibee was an alternate design optimized for anti-submarine warfare, much smaller and slower than the Threshers and with a quiet turbo-electric propulsion system. The engineering spaces were also redesigned, with the turbines supported on "rafts" that were suspended from the hull on isolation mounts for acoustic quieting. Drag was reduced, with external fittings kept to a minimum and the sail greatly reduced in size.

However, the small sail had disadvantages as well, including room for only one periscope and a reduced number of electronics masts, less convenient surfaced operation in rough seas, and an increased possibility of "broaching" (inadvertent surfacing) at periscope depth in rough seas.

Only Thresher was fitted with a five-bladed symmetric screw, very similar to the ones originally fitted to the Skipjacks, which allowed her to reach this speed. During trials of the Skipjack class, it was found that the propeller produced noise below cavitation depth. It was determined that the source of this noise, called blade-rate, was the blades of the screw vibrating when they hit the wake of the sail and control surfaces. This produced a noise that could carry for many miles and could be used by an enemy submarine to set up a firing solution because the frequency of blade-rate was directly related to the speed of the submarine (the RPM of the screw). The solution was to either make the screw smaller so it did not hit the wakes of the sail and control surfaces, which would cavitate more easily because of its increased speed, or have a large screw that gently interacted with these areas of disturbed water. The latter solution was chosen for all subsequent American SSNs. Jack was designed with counter-rotating screws, each of which were smaller than the standard seven-bladed screw, as an alternative solution to the blade-rate problem.

The class received mid-life upgrades in the late 1970s and 1980s, including the  sonar suite with a retractable towed array, Mk 117 torpedo fire control equipment, and other electronics upgrades.

Armament
The boats had their torpedo tubes moved to the middle of the hull and angled outboard.  This made available the required large space in the bow for the BQQ-2 (BQQ-5 as modernized from the late 1970s) sonar sphere, a new and powerful low-frequency detection sensor. Initially armed with Mark 37 torpedoes, by the late 1960s they carried the improved Mark 48 and the nuclear UUM-44 SUBROC short-range anti-submarine missile, replacing up to six Mk 48s. The Threshers were the first class fitted with the Mark 113 fire control system that enabled the use of SUBROC; they were later upgraded with the Mark 117 system. In the late 1970s the UGM-84 Harpoon anti-ship missile was introduced; typically four were carried in place of Mk 48s.

The maximum weapons load was 23 torpedoes/missiles or, theoretically, up to 42 Mk 57, Mk 60, or Mk 67 mines. Any mix of mines, torpedoes, and missiles could be included.

Construction
The first submarine commissioned in the class was the ill-fated , and so the class was known by her name.  When Thresher was lost on 10 April 1963, the class took the name of the second ship in the class, . Thresher had numerous advanced design features and embodied the future of US Navy submarine design, and her loss was a serious blow. As a result, the SUBSAFE program was instituted to correct design flaws and introduce strict manufacturing and construction quality control in critical systems. The seawater and main ballast systems of future classes (Sturgeon-class SSNs and  SSBNs) were redesigned, and some Threshers and other submarines were rebuilt to SUBSAFE standards. SUBSAFE includes specific training of SUBSAFE quality assurance inspectors in the engineering crew, and tracks extremely detailed information about every component of a submarine that is subject to sea pressure.  Joints in any equipment carrying seawater must be welded (not brazed), and every hull penetration larger than a specified size can be quickly shut by a remote hydraulic mechanism. The program has been very successful, as no SUBSAFE submarines have been lost as of 2019 ( was not SUBSAFE).

Although counter-rotating propellers produced impressive gains in speed on the experimental , in Jack the results were disappointing because of the difficulty in sealing the shaft. Jack was also used to test polymer ejection that could reduce flow noises that degraded sonar performance.

Ships in class

See also
 List of submarines of the United States Navy
 List of submarine classes of the United States Navy
 Ship Characteristics Board – USS Thresher loss

References

 Gardiner, Robert and Chumbley, Stephen, Conway's All the World's Fighting Ships 1947–1995, London: Conway Maritime Press, 1995. .
 Karam, P. Andrew and Thompson, Roger, Rig Ship for Ultra Quiet: Life on a nuclear attack boat at the end of the Cold War. Google Books link
 Hutchinson, Robert, Jane's Submarines, War Beneath The Waves, From 1776 To The Present Day, Harper Paperbacks, 2005. .
 Polmar, Norman (2004). Cold War Submarines: The Design and Construction of U.S. and Soviet Submarines, 1945-2001. Dulles: Brassey's. .

External links

 On Eternal Patrol USS Thresher page
 NavSource.org SSN Photo Gallery Index
 SSN-594 Permit class at GlobalSecurity.org

Submarine classes
 
 Permit class
 Permit class